Derrick Strong (born April 16, 1982) is former American football defensive end. He was originally signed by the Rhein Fire in 2005. He played college football at Illinois. In 2008, the Arena football team, the Philadelphia Soul, acquired him.

External links
Just Sports Stats

Rhein Fire players
1982 births
Living people
Columbus Destroyers players
Philadelphia Soul players
Illinois Fighting Illini football players
Players of American football from Chicago
American football defensive ends
African-American players of American football
21st-century African-American sportspeople
20th-century African-American people